Luke's Washful Waiting is a 1916 short comedy film starring Harold Lloyd.

Cast
 Harold Lloyd as Lonesome Luke
 Bebe Daniels as The Girl
 Snub Pollard (as Harry Pollard)

See also
 Harold Lloyd filmography

References

External links

1916 films
1916 short films
American silent short films
American black-and-white films
1916 comedy films
Films directed by Hal Roach
Silent American comedy films
Lonesome Luke films
American comedy short films
1910s American films